Rami Kleinstein (born 10 November 1962) is an Israeli singer and composer.

Biography
Kleinstein was born in New York City, to an American-Jewish family of Ashkenazi Jewish descent. He immigrated to Israel with his family in 1970 at age 8. As a child, he studied piano and classical music after his parents recognized his musical talent and decided to have him trained to be a classical pianist. In 1988, he married the Israeli singer Rita. They first began dating in their mid-teens and performed together in the 1980s while doing their national service in an entertainment troupe of the Israel Defense Forces. Kleinstein subsequently composed and produced many of Rita's songs. The couple, now divorced, has two daughters.

Musical career

In 1986, Rami's first solo album,  ('On the day of the bomb') achieved gold status. In 1997, his sixth album,    ('Everything you want') reached triple platinum status within ten days of release. He was voted "Singer of the Year" in 1995, after his album  ('Apples and dates') reached triple platinum.

Since 1985, Rami has been composing, arranging and accompanying Rita. He has written music for lyrics by Bob Dylan, Ehud Banai, and  Hanoch Levin.

Discography
1986: 
1989: 
1991: 
1993: 
1995: 
1997: 
2000: 
2000: 
2005: 
2009: 
2009:  (with Synergia) 
2010: Live
2012: 
2014: 
2015:

See also

Music of Israel
Israeli rock

References

1962 births
Living people
Singers from New York City
American emigrants to Israel
20th-century American Jews
Israeli composers
Israeli Ashkenazi Jews
Israeli pop singers
21st-century American Jews
American Ashkenazi Jews